The Diocese of Tarnów is a Roman Catholic diocese in Poland. According to Church statistics, it is the most religious diocese in Poland, with 72.5% weekly Mass attendance.

References 

Roman Catholic dioceses in Poland
Tarnów
Roman Catholic dioceses and prelatures established in the 18th century